La Discusión  is a  Spanish newspaper published from Chile.It is the second oldest newspaper  still in circulation in Chile, after El Mercurio de Valparaíso.It was founded by Juan Ignacio Montenegro.

References

External links
La Discusión official website
Publications established in 1870
Newspapers published in Chile
Spanish-language newspapers